Adrian Romeo Niță (born 8 March 2003) is a Romanian professional footballer who plays as a winger for CSM Slatina.

Career statistics

Club

Honours

Club 
FCSB

 Cupa României: 2019–20

References

External links

2003 births
Living people
Romanian footballers
Romania youth international footballers
Association football forwards
Liga I players
FC Steaua București players
Liga II players
AFC Turris-Oltul Turnu Măgurele players
FC Unirea Constanța players
CS Concordia Chiajna players
Sportspeople from Slatina, Romania